Riccardo Cassin (2 January 19096 August 2009) was an Italian mountaineer, developer of mountaineering equipment and author, and an important figure in the history of rock climbing.

Life
Born into a peasant family at San Vito al Tagliamento in Friuli, when this region was still part of the Austro-Hungarian Empire, Cassin had humble origins. When he was three his father, Valentino, emigrated to Canada where he died in a mining accident in 1913 when aged 29. Cassin left school at the age of 12 to work for a blacksmith. In 1926, when 17, he moved to Lecco where he found employment at a steel plant. His first love was boxing, but he soon became fascinated by the mountains that tower over Lake Como and Lake Garda.
 
In 1940 he married Irma, with whom he had three sons – Valentino, Pierantonio and Guido.

Alpinism

Cassin started mountaineering in around 1930 together with a group known as the Ragni di Lecco (spiders of Lecco). In 1934, he made the first ascent of the Piccolissima of the Tre Cime di Lavaredo. In 1935, after having repeated Emilio Comici's route on the north-west face of the Civetta, he climbed the south-eastern ridge of the Trieste Tower and, with Vittorio Ratti, established a new route on the north face of Cima Ovest di Lavaredo. In 1937, Cassin made his first climb on the granite of the Western Alps. Over the course of three days, 14–16 July, he made the first ascent of the north-east face of Piz Badile in the Val Bregaglia (Bergell), Switzerland, accompanied by Ratti and Gino Esposito after they teamed up with M. Molteni and G. Valsecchi, the latter two of whom died of exhaustion and exposure on the descent. This route is known today as the Cassin Route or the Via Cassin. He confirmed his extraordinary mountaineering skills 50 years later by climbing this route again at the age of 78.

Perhaps his most celebrated first ascent was of the Walker Spur on the north face of the Grandes Jorasses in the Mont Blanc massif on 4–6 August 1938 with Esposito and Ugo Tizzoni. The alpine historian Helmut Dumler comments that this was "by then universally acknowledged as the finest alpine challenge." According to Claire Engel:

In 1939, together with Tizzoni, Cassin made the first ascent of a steep line on the north face of the Aiguille de Leschaux.

Cassin was one of the leading mountaineers of the inter-war period.  In all, Cassin made a total of 2,500 ascents, of which over 100 were first ascents.

World War II
During World War II Cassin fought on the side of the partisans against the German occupiers. On 26 April 1945, when he was chief partisan, both he and Ratti (who had accompanied him on several first ascents) attempted to stop a group of German soldiers from escaping to the Valtellina and St Moritz, and Ratti was shot dead. Cassin was decorated for his actions in the partisan campaign during the years 1943–45.

Expedition leader

Cassin was supposed to have been on the Italian expedition that made the first ascent of K2 in the Karakoram in 1954, but Ardito Desio, the chief expedition leader for the Italian Alpine Club, preferred not to have Cassin participate. According to Cassin himself:

Following this experience, Cassin concentrated on organizing and leading expeditions himself, including the first ascent of Gasherbrum IV in the Karakorum Range by Walter Bonatti and Carlo Mauri on 6 August 1958 and an expedition that climbed Jirishanca in the Andes in 1969.

In 1961, Cassin was both leader of and a successful ascentionist on the expedition that made the first ascent of the eponymous Cassin Ridge on Mount McKinley in Alaska, at that date the most technical route on the mountain. After this ascent, President Kennedy sent Cassin a telegram of congratulations and, had the Bay of Pigs crisis not intervened, he was scheduled to meet Cassin. In 1975, Cassin led an expedition to the then-unclimbed south face of Lhotse in the Himalaya, but this attempt was unsuccessful as a result of bad weather.

Mountaineering equipment
Cassin began designing and producing mountaineering equipment in Lecco in 1947 when he produced his first rock pitons.  In 1948 he produced his first hammers; his first ice axes appeared in 1949; and 1950 saw the introduction of his carabiners. That same year he produced the "first eiderdown duvet jackets for non-European mountaineering expeditions", these going into production two years later. In 1958 he and his son produced their first harness prototype; this went into production two years later, the same year that he introduced titanium crampons.

In 1967 the company became a Limited Company and in the early 1980s it moved from Lecco to Valmadrera. In 1997 the CAMP company bought the Cassin trademark.

100th birthday celebrations
Cassin's 100th birthday fell on 2 January 2009. A retrospective book, entitled Riccardo Cassin: Cento volti di un grande alpinista ("Riccardo Cassin: One Hundred Faces of a Great Alpinist"), was produced to mark the occasion, containing one hundred testimonials from people associated with Cassin, including Edouard Frendo, Georges Livanos, John F. Kennedy, Reinhold Messner, Carlo Mauri, Walter Bonatti, Gianni Brera and Candido Cannavò.

Cassin died in Piano dei Resinelli, Lecco, on 6 August 2009, aged 100.

Honours
Cavaliere di Gran Croce Ordine al merito della Repubblica Italiana (Rome, 9 February 1999)
Grand'Ufficiale dell'Ordine al merito della Repubblica Italiana (5 January 1980)

Sources
Riccardo Cassin, Alpi occidentali: Bianco, Cervino, Rosa, Grafica e Arte Bergamo, 1990,  
Riccardo Cassin, Fifty Years of Alpinism, Diadem, 1980, 
Alessandro Gogna, Laura Melesi and Daniele Redaelli, Riccardo Cassin: Cento volti di un grande alpinista, Bellavite Editore, 2008,

References

External links

Biography on SummitPost
Cassin Ridge (Mount McKinley) page on SummitPost, with description, itinerary and topo
Interview with Cassin at climbing.com
Photos of the Cassin Ridge (Mount McKinley)
Riccardo Cassin – Daily Telegraph obituary
Obituary by the Associated Press
Riccardo Cassin: Mountaineer whose exploits across five decades gave him legendary status, The Independent Obituary

1909 births
2009 deaths
Men centenarians
Italian centenarians
Italian mountain climbers
People from San Vito al Tagliamento